Luis Francisco Miranda Rivera, O.Carm (born January 24, 1954) is a Puerto Rican-born American bishop of the Catholic Church. He has been serving as bishop for the Diocese of Fajardo-Humacao in Puerto Rico since August 15, 2020.

Biography
Luis Miranda Rivera was born on January 24, 1954, in Santurce, Puerto Rico. On September 14, 1984, he was ordained to the priesthood for the Order of Our Lady of Carmel by Cardinal Luis Aponte Martínez. Miranda Rivera has a Bachelor of Philosophy degree from Bayamón Central University in Bayamon, Puerto Rico and a Bachelor's degree in Theology of Religious Life from the University of Salamanca in Salamanca, Spain.   

Pope Francis appointed Miranda Rivera as bishop for the Diocese of Fajardo-Humacao on May 16, 2020.  On August 15, 2020, Miranda Rivera was consecrated and installed by Archbishop Roberto González Nievesas as bishop.

See also

 Catholic Church hierarchy
 Catholic Church in the United States
 Historical list of the Catholic bishops of Puerto Rico
 Historical list of the Catholic bishops of the United States
 List of Catholic bishops of the United States
 Lists of patriarchs, archbishops, and bishops

References

External links
 Roman Catholic Diocese of Fajardo-Humacao (Official Site in Spanish)

Episcopal succession

 
 

1954 births 
Living people
21st-century Roman Catholic bishops in Puerto Rico
American Roman Catholic priests
Bishops appointed by Pope Francis
People from Santurce, Puerto Rico
Puerto Rican Roman Catholic bishops
University of Salamanca alumni
Roman Catholic bishops of Fajardo–Humacao